Bird of Passage or Birds of Passage may refer to:

 Bird of passage, a migratory bird, or, figuratively, an itinerant person

Music
Birds of Passage (band), a musical project of Alicia Merz  
Birds of Passage (album), by Bel Canto, 1989
Birds of Passage, a 1987 album by Sadao Watanabe

Theatre and film
Birds of Passage (film), 2018 drama film
Birds of Passage, 1983 play by Hanif Kureishi

Literature
The Bird of Passage, or, Flying Glimpses of Many Lands (1849) travelog by Isabella Frances Romer
Birds of Passage: Migrant Labor and Industrial Societies (1979) nonfiction by Michael J. Piore
Birds of Passage (1981) novel by Bernice Rubens
Birds of Passage (1983) novel by Brian Castro
Bird of Passage: Recollections of a Physicist (1985) autobiography by Rudolf Peierls
Birds of Passage (1993) novel by Linda Leith
Birds of Passage (2005) novel by Lou Drofenik

Other uses
Bird of Passage (biplane), a Voisin 1907 biplane owned by Lord Brabazon